Paul Mijksenaar (born 1944, Amsterdam) is a designer of visual information and founder and director of the international design Bureau Mijksenaar, based in Amsterdam and New York City. In 1965, he graduated from the Institute for Applied Arts Education Amsterdam (IvKNO, later the Gerrit Rietveld Academie) in product design. He started off as a freelance product designer in 1966, then as a senior designer and team leader for the Associatie voor Total Design NV (or Total Design) in 1978 before establishing Bureau Mijksenaar in 1986. 

Mijksenaar is a specialist in creating visual information systems, such as wayfinding signage for railway stations and airports including New York's JFK and LaGuardia, New Jersey's Newark, and Amsterdam's Schiphol. His work for the Port Authority of New York and New Jersey was echoed in the set design for Steven Spielberg's film The Terminal.

Besides his practice he is also a professor in Visual Information Design at the faculty of Industrial Design Engineering at the Delft University of Technology in the Netherlands. He also writes a monthly article in the Dutch newspaper NRC Handelsblad about everyday problems and solving them using information design.

Major publications

Paul Mijksenaar (2008). Wayfinding at Schiphol. Publisher: Graphic Design Museum. , 9789072637277.

References

External links

 Mijksenaar

1944 births
Living people
Dutch designers
Academic staff of the Delft University of Technology
Artists from Amsterdam